English Oceans is the tenth studio album by American rock band Drive-By Truckers, released on March 4, 2014, by ATO Records. It was produced by long-time collaborator David Barbe and recorded during two weeks in the late spring of 2013.  Wes Freed again provided the album's artwork and cover. English Oceans marks the first time the Drive-By Truckers returned to the studio in four years and is one of three records the band has released with two songwriters. It's also the band's first record after bassist Matt Patton officially joined the band.

The cover art for this album is from a painting by Wes Freed based on a photograph of Abby, Sylvie, and Grace Weissman. The girls' father, Barr Weissman, made the 2009 documentary about the Truckers and the family has remained close with the band. The original painting hangs in the family's living room.

Music and lyrics 
While previous Drive-By Truckers records are largely dominated by guitarist Patterson Hood's songs, fellow guitarist Mike Cooley split songwriting duties with Hood for English Oceans. It also marks the first time Cooley took singing duties on a song written by Hood.

According to Chris Conaton of PopMatters, their songs are character studies set to Southern rock music like on the band's previous albums, while The Guardian journalist Dave Simpson wrote that English Oceans is "full of their familiar southern rock: soul and brass occasionally adorn storytelling songs which attempt to right wrongs and champion the worker against The Man."

Critical reception 

English Oceans received generally positive reviews from music critics. At Metacritic, which assigns a normalized rating out of 100 to reviews from mainstream critics, the album holds an average score of 79, based on 25 reviews. In a review for NPR, Robert Christgau called it Drive-By Truckers' first exceptional album since Brighter Than Creation's Dark (2008) because of how Cooley's songwriting is superior to that of Hood, particularly with songs such as "Shit Shots Count". Pitchfork critic Ian Cohen was also impressed by Cooley's performance, but felt that the album is too often impeded by Hood's more reserved songwriting.

At the end of the year, Christgau named English Oceans the fifth-best album of 2014 in his list for The Barnes & Noble Review.

Commercial performance
The album debuted at No. 16 on Billboard 200. and No. 4 on Top Rock Albums for chart dated March 22, 2014, selling 18,000 copies in the first week. The album has sold 51,000 copies in the United States as of September 2015.

Track listing

Personnel
Patterson Hood - lead and backing vocals, rhythm electric and acoustic guitars, Kay/Baxendale mandocello
Mike Cooley - lead and backing vocals, lead and rhythm electric and acoustic guitars, banjo
Brad Morgan - drums, percussion
Matt Patton - bass, backing vocals
Jay Gonzalez - Hammond B-3, piano, Wurlitzer, lead and rhythm electric and acoustic guitars, backing vocals

Charts

References

External links
 
 Album Stream: Drive-By Truckers - English Oceans at Paste

Drive-By Truckers albums
ATO Records albums
2014 albums